Chandrashekar (born 1962 23 July), known by his stage name Sihi Kahi Chandru, which literally means "sweet and bitter" Chandru, is an Indian Kannada film and television actor.

Career
His wife Sihi Kahi Geetha and he were the main protagonists in an old Doordarshan Kannada serial titled Sihi Kahi which was televised every Friday at the 7.00-7.30 slot, between 1986-87. Those being initial days of Doordarshan, the show had a large viewership and the serial was extremely popular with the Kannada audience. It was a situation-comedy (sitcom) serial in which Chandru and Geetha enacted the role of a husband and wife. Their friendship blossomed into love and later they walked down the matrimony aisle in real life on 9 November 1990. Their success in the serial gave Chandru the name "Sihi Kahi Chandru" and Geetha the name "Sihi Kahi Geetha". He is also a noted theatre personality, known for his comedy play Neenaanaadre naaneenena? (If you are me, then am I you?) an adaptation of Shakespeare's play The Comedy of Errors, incidentally also adapted in film a production in Hindi (Angoor).

He presents a cooking TV show, Bombat Bhojana, on Kannada TV channel Suvarna.

He has acted in many Kannada movies as a comedian and supporting actor. He is best known for his comedy scenes with Bank Janardhan and Umashree. He had a crucial cameo in the 1990 film Ganeshana Maduve (by Phani Ramachandra) as a tax inspector. The nickname of "Sihi Kahi", a phrase referring to the collocation of bittersweet in Kannada, is attributed to the diversity of roles that he has portrayed, from comedy to negative roles. His popular works include Gowri Ganesha, Putakkana Highway and Tenali Rama. As a director, Chandru has directed television serials Silli Lalli and Paapa Pandu.

In 2017, he participated in Bigg Boss Kannada 5 and got evicted on the 49th day.

In 2021, he judged a cooking reality show called Cookku with Kirikku with Chef Venkatesh Bhat.

Filmography

 1990 - Ganeshana Maduve
 1990 - Golmal Radhakrishna (Part 1) 
 1991 - Golmal Radhakrishna (Part 2) 
 1991 - Gauri Ganesha 
 1992 - Belliyappa Bangarappa
 1992 - Bombat Hendthi
 2001 - Sparsha 
 2001 - Mathadana
 2006 - Honeymoon Express
 2006 - Tenali Ram
 2006 - Julie
 2008 - Kodagana Koli Nungitha
 2008 - Milana
 2008 - Hani Hani
 2008 - Mast Maja Maadi
 2009 - Josh
 2009 - Maleyali Jotheyali 
 2010 - Shri Harikathe
 2010 - Naanu Nanna Kanasu
 2010 - Ullasa Utsaha 
 2011 - Akasmath
 2011 - Puttakkana Highway
 2011 - Mayadanta Male 
 2011 - Aidondla Aidu 
 2011 - 9 To 12 
 2011 - Prince 
 2011 - O Manase  
 2015 - Devara Nadalli
 2022 - Old Monk

References

External links

Indian male film actors
Male actors in Kannada cinema
Living people
1961 births
20th-century Indian male actors
21st-century Indian male actors
Indian male television actors
Male actors in Kannada television
Bigg Boss Kannada contestants
Recipients of the Rajyotsava Award 2022